Bone Cave or Bone Caves may refer to:

In Australia:
Bone Cave (Tasmania), a cave in the Weld Valley, Tasmania
In the United Kingdom:
Bone Cave, one of the caves at Dan yr Ogof in the Swansea Valley, Wales
 Bone Caves (Inchnadamph), caves in Inchnadamph, Sutherland, Scotland
In the United States:
Big Bone Cave, a cave and natural area in Van Buren County, Tennessee
Bone Cave, Tennessee, an unincorporated community in Van Buren County
Bone Cave, an archaeological site along the Great Allegheny Passage near Cumberland, Maryland